In mathematics, an autonomous convergence theorem is one of a family of related  theorems which specify conditions guaranteeing global asymptotic stability of a  continuous  autonomous dynamical system.

History
The Markus–Yamabe conjecture was formulated as an attempt to give conditions for global stability of continuous dynamical systems in two dimensions. However, the Markus–Yamabe conjecture does not hold for dimensions higher than two, a problem which autonomous convergence theorems attempt to address. The first autonomous convergence theorem was constructed by Russell Smith. This theorem was later refined by Michael Li and James Muldowney.

An example autonomous convergence theorem
A comparatively simple autonomous convergence theorem is as follows:

Let  be a  vector in some space , evolving according to an  autonomous differential equation . Suppose that  is  convex and forward  invariant under , and that there exists a  fixed point  such that .

This autonomous convergence theorem is very closely related to the Banach fixed-point theorem.

How autonomous convergence works
Note: this is an intuitive description of how autonomous convergence theorems guarantee stability, not a strictly mathematical description.

The key point in the example theorem given above is the existence of a negative logarithmic norm, which is derived from a vector  norm. So long as the  trajectories of all points in the phase space are  bounded, all trajectories must therefore eventually converge to the same point.

The autonomous convergence theorems by Russell Smith, Michael Li and James Muldowney work in a similar manner, but they rely on showing that the area of two-dimensional shapes in phase space decrease with time. This means that no  periodic orbits can exist, as all closed loops must shrink to a point. If the system is bounded, then according to Pugh's closing lemma there can be no  chaotic behaviour either, so all trajectories must eventually reach an equilibrium.

Michael Li has also developed an extended autonomous convergence theorem which is applicable to dynamical systems containing an  invariant manifold.

Notes

Stability theory
Fixed points (mathematics)
Theorems in dynamical systems